Cry Softly Lonely One is the twelfth music album recorded by Roy Orbison, and his sixth for MGM Records. The album was released in October 1967 and included two singles: "Communication Breakdown" and the title tune, both of which were minor hits in the States early that year. "Communication Breakdown" did much better in Australia, where it reached #9 in February. According to the official Roy Orbison biography, the London Records release (non U.S.) of this album featured the extra track "Just One Time".

Track listing

Personnel

Tracks 1, 3, 5, 7, 8, 10 Arranged by Jim Hall
Tracks 6, 11, 12 Arranged by Bill McElhiney
Jack Anesh - cover design
Murray Laden - cover photography

References

Roy Orbison albums
1967 albums
Albums produced by Wesley Rose
MGM Records albums